ShangMi 3 (SM3) is a cryptographic hash function used in the Chinese National Standard. It was published by the National Cryptography Administration on 2010-12-17 as "GM/T 0004-2012: SM3 cryptographic hash algorithm".

SM3 is used for implementing digital signatures, message authentication codes, and pseudorandom number generators. The algorithm is public and is considered similar to SHA-256 in security and efficiency. SM3 is used with Transport Layer Security.

Definitive standards 
SM3 is defined in each of:
GM/T 0004-2012: SM3 cryptographic hash algorithm
GB/T 32905-2016: Information security techniques—SM3 cryptographic hash algorithm
ISO/IEC 10118-3:2018—IT Security techniques—Hash-functions—Part 3: Dedicated hash-functions

References

See also
SM4 (cipher)

Cryptographic hash functions
Checksum algorithms